Order of battle at the Battle of the Monongahela lists the opposing forces engaged in the Battle of the Monongahela July 9, 1755.

British Crown
 Major-general Edward Braddock (commander-in-chief) DOW
 Colonel George Washington, formerly of the Virginia Regiment (volunteer aide)
 Captain Robert Orme, Coldstream Guards (aide) WIA
 Captain Roger Morris, 48th Foot (aide) WIA
 Captain William Shirley (secretary) KIA
 Captain Francis Halkett, 44th Foot (brigade major) 
 Lieutenant-colonel Sir John St. Clair, 22nd Foot (deputy quartermaster-general) WIA
 Lieutenant Mathew Leslie, 44th Foot (deputy quartermaster) WIA
 Captain Christopher Gist, formerly of the Virginia Regiment (guide)

British Army
 44th Regiment of Foot, Colonel Sir Peter Halkett (commanding officer) KIA; Ensign Daniel Disney (adjutant) WIA
 48th Regiment of Foot, Lieutenant-colonel Ralph Burtong (commanding officer) WIA; Lieutenant John Gordon (adjutant)
 3rd Independent New York Company, Captain John Rutherford (commanding)
 4th Independent New York Company, Captain Horatio Gates (commanding)
 3rd Independent South Carolina Company, Captain Paul Demere (commanding)

Board of Ordnance

 Train of Royal Artillery (some 60 officers and men, six 12 pounders, six 6 pounders, 4 howitzers and around 30 coehorn mortars) commanded by Captain Orde

Royal Navy
 A detachment of 33 sailors, Lieutenant Charles Spendelowe, R.N. (commanding) KIA, two midshipmen, two boatswain's mates, one carpenter, and twenty-seven able seamen.

Indian Department
 Captain George Croghan (interpreter)
 Captain Andrew Montour (interpreter)
 Seven Indian scouts, Scarouady (leader)

Provincial troops

Virginia
 Captain Polson's Carpenters, Captain William Polson (commanding)
 Captain Mercer's Carpenters, Captain George Mercer (commanding)
 Captain Stephen's Rangers, Captain Adam Stephen (commanding)
 Captain Wagener's Rangers, Captain Thomas Waggoner (commanding)
 Captain Peyronnie's Rangers, Captain William Peyronnie (commanding)
 Captain Hogg's Rangers, Captain Peter Hogg (commanding)
 Captain Cocke's Rangers, Captain Thomas Cocke (commanding)
 Captain Lewis' Rangers, Captain Andrew Lewis (commanding)
 Captain Stewart's Mounted Rangers or Virginia Light Horse Troop, Captain Robert Stuart (commanding)

North Carolina
 North Carolina Provincial Regiment (Major Edward Brice Dobbs commanding)

French Crown
 Captain Daniel Liénard de Beaujeu (commanding officer) KIA

Compagnies Franches de la Marine
 105 officers and men (3 officers, 20 cadets, 72 other ranks) 
 Captain Daniel Liénard de Beaujeu (see above).
 Captain Jean-Daniel Dumas
 Ensign Charles Michel Mouet de Langlade

Canadian militia
 146 militiamen

Indian Allies
 Seven Nations of Canada
Hurons
Abenaki
 From the Pays d'en Haut
Odawa
Lenni Lenape
A total of 640 warriors.

Notes

References
 Chartrand, René (2004). Monongahela 1754–1755. Osprey Publishing.
 Kronoskaf: 1755-07-09 – Ambush on the Monongahela. Retrieved 2017-10-05
 Nichols, Franklin Thayer (1947). "The Organization of Braddock's Army." The William and Mary Quarterly 4(2): 125–147.
 Preston, David L. (2015). Braddock's Defeat. Oxford University Press.

Citations

Battles involving France
Battles involving Great Britain
Battles of the French and Indian War
Orders of battle